The Grenada national basketball team is the national men's basketball team from the country Grenada. It is administered by the Grenada National Basketball Association.

International Performance

FIBA AmeriCup
yet to qualify

Caribbean Championship
yet to participate

References

External links
GrenadaHoops - 'Building Communities Through Sport'

Men's national basketball teams
Basketball in Grenada
Basketball teams in Grenada
1975 establishments in Grenada
Basketball